Jamie William Lindsay (born 11 October 1995) is a Scottish professional footballer who plays as a midfielder for Rotherham United. Lindsay has previously played for Celtic, Dumbarton, Greenock Morton and Ross County, and has represented Scotland in youth internationals.

Club career
Raised in Larkhall, Lindsay started his career with Celtic. He played regularly for their development sides including scoring against A.C. Milan in the UEFA Youth League.

He joined Scottish Championship side Dumbarton on loan in July 2015. Making his senior debut for the club in a 3–2 victory over Morton on 26 July 2015. He extended his loan deal for the rest of the season in January after winning the club's November/December player of the month award. He won the club's Young Player of the Year award before returning to Celtic.

Lindsay joined Morton on loan in July 2016 for the season. He scored his first senior goal on his debut against Berwick Rangers

On 3 July 2017, Lindsay joined Ross County on loan until the end of the season. He scored his first career professional league goal during this time, in a 2–1 away win at Dundee. He signed a permanent deal with the Staggies in June 2018.

On 24 July 2019, Lindsay joined EFL League One side Rotherham United for an undisclosed fee, signing a three-year contract with the club.

Career statistics

Honours
Ross County
Scottish Championship: 2018–19
Scottish Challenge Cup: 2018–19

Rotherham United
League One runner-up: 2021–22
EFL Trophy: 2021–22

References

External links

1995 births
Living people
Sportspeople from Larkhall
Footballers from South Lanarkshire
Scottish footballers
Association football midfielders
Celtic F.C. players
Dumbarton F.C. players
Greenock Morton F.C. players
Motherwell F.C. players
Ross County F.C. players
Rotherham United F.C. players
Scottish Professional Football League players
English Football League players